The 1978 Virginia Slims of Chicago  was a women's tennis tournament played on indoor carpet courts at the International Amphitheatre  in Chicago, Illinois in the United States that was part of the 1978 Virginia Slims World Championship Series. It was the seventh edition of the tournament and was held from January 30 through February 5, 1978. First-seeded Martina Navratilova won the singles title and earned $20,000 first-prize money.

Finals

Singles
 Martina Navratilova defeated  Evonne Goolagong Cawley 6–7(4–5), 6–2, 6–2
 It was Navratilova's 4th singles title of the year and the 17th of her career.

Doubles
 Betty Stöve /  Evonne Goolagong Cawley defeated  Rosie Casals /  JoAnne Russell 6–1, 6–4

Prize money

References

External links
 International Tennis Federation (ITF) tournament edition details
 Tournament draws

Virginia Slims of Chicago
Virginia Slims of Chicago
Virginia Slims of Chicago
Virginia Slims of Chicago